Duke of Nochera is a hereditary title in the Peerage of Spain, accompanied by the dignity of Grandee and granted in 1656 by Philip IV to Francisco de Moura Corterreal, Viceroy of Sardinia and Catalonia and governor of the Spanish Netherlands.

The title had been created previously in 1521 by Charles I, and its last holder had been Francesco Maria Domenico Carafa, who at his death left no descendants. It was subsequently created for a second time in 1659 when it was bestowed upon General Moura.

At the death with no descendants of the 8th Duke in 1824, the dukedom became extinct until it was rehabilitated by Alfonso XIII in 1922, on behalf of Alfonso Falcó, great-grandson of the 7th Duke.

The title makes reference to the town of Nocera Inferiore, in the province of Salerno, Italy.

Dukes of Nocera (1521)

Tiberio Carafa (1521-1527)
Ferdinando I Carafa (1527-1558)
Alfonso Carafa (1558-1581)
Ferdinando II Carafa (1581-1593
Francesco Maria Carafa (1593-1642)
Francesco Maria Domenico Carafa (1642-1648)

Dukes of Nochera (1659)

Francisco de Moura Corterreal y Melo, 1st Duke of Nochera (1610-1675) 
Leonor de Moura y Moncada de Aragón, 2nd Duchess of Nochera (d. 1706), daughter of the 1st Duke
Juana de Moura y Moncada de Aragón, 3rd Duchess of Nochera (1650-1707), sister of the 2nd Duchess
Francisco Pío de Saboya y Moura, 4th Duke of Nochera (1672-1723), son of the 3rd Duchess
Gisberto Pío de Saboya y Spínola, 5th Duke of Nochera (d. 1776), son of the 4th Duke
Isabel María Pío de Saboya y Spínola, 6th Duchess of Nochera (1719-1799), sister of the 5th Duke
Antonio Valcárcel y Pío de Saboya, 7th Duke of Nochera (1748-1808), son of the 6th Duchess
Antonio Valcárcel y Pascual de Pobil, 8th Duke of Nochera (?-?), son of the 7th Duke

Dukes of Nochera (1922)
Alfonso Falcó y de la Gándara, 9th Duke of Nochera (1903-1967), grandson of the 8th Duke
María Asunción Falcó y de la Gándara, 10th Duchess of Nochera (1883-1971), sister of the 9th Duke
Carlo Ernesto Balbo Bertone di Sambuy, 11th Duke of Nochera (1916-2003), grandson of the 10th Duchess’ younger sister
Filippo Balbo Bertone di Sambuy, 12th Duke of Nochera (b. 1956), son of the 11th Duke

See also
List of dukes in the peerage of Spain
List of current Grandees of Spain

References 

Dukedoms of Spain
Grandees of Spain
Lists of dukes
Lists of Spanish nobility